The 2005 Bulgarian Figure Skating Championships were the National Championships of the 2004–05 figure skating season. Skaters competed in the disciplines of men's singles, ladies' singles, pair skating, and ice dancing.

The results were used to choose the teams to the 2005 World Championships and the 2005 European Championships.

Results

Men

Ladies

Pairs

Ice dancing

External links
 results

Bulgarian Figure Skating Championships, 2005